The Humanist Party is a  Spanish political party founded in 1984 and is a member of the Humanist International.

External links
 Official website

References

1984 establishments in Spain
Spain
Spain
Political parties established in 1984
Political parties in Spain